Robert Peter Renwick (born 21 July 1988) is a Scottish former competitive swimmer who represented Great Britain at the Olympics and FINA world championships, as well as Scotland in the Commonwealth Games.  Renwick is a world champion and a Commonwealth Games gold medallist.  He first rose to prominence by swimming the anchor leg in the Scottish men's 4×200-metre freestyle relay team at the 2006 Commonwealth Games as a 17-year-old.  The team won silver, after he was narrowly touched out by the English relay team.  Renwick featured in every major Olympic or world championship for Britain from 2007 to 2016.

Career
Robert qualified for Team GB at the 2008 Beijing Olympics in two events, the 200-metre freestyle and the 4×200-metre freestyle relay. He achieved this by finishing second, behind Ross Davenport, in the 2008 Long Course British Championships (incorporating the Olympic trials). His time in the final was 1:48.29.

Renwick won the gold medal in the 200 m freestyle at the 2010 Commonwealth Games in Delhi, India.  He touched out Kendrick Monk of Australia in a close race.

His greatest success came in the 2015 World Championships in Kazan, Russia where Renwick, along with Dan Wallace, Callum Jarvis and James Guy beat the United States in the men's 4×200 m freestyle.  Renwick's 2nd leg split of 1:45.98 was the fastest of his career at the age of 27.

Renwick held the British record for the 200 m freestyle in a time of 1:45.99 for six years, and was a member of the 4×200 m freestyle relay team that holds the record at 7:04.43.

Honours 
Renwick was inducted into the Scottish Swimming Hall of Fame in 2018.

See also 
 List of Commonwealth Games medallists in swimming (men)

References

External links
British Records

Commonwealth Games silver medallists for Scotland
Scottish male freestyle swimmers
Olympic swimmers of Great Britain
Swimmers at the 2008 Summer Olympics
Swimmers at the 2012 Summer Olympics
Swimmers at the 2006 Commonwealth Games
Swimmers at the 2010 Commonwealth Games
Living people
1988 births
Commonwealth Games gold medallists for Scotland
Scottish Olympic medallists
Alumni of the University of Strathclyde
Sportspeople from Aberdeen
People educated at Cults Academy
Medalists at the FINA World Swimming Championships (25 m)
World Aquatics Championships medalists in swimming
Swimmers at the 2016 Summer Olympics
Olympic silver medallists for Great Britain
Medalists at the 2016 Summer Olympics
Olympic silver medalists in swimming
Commonwealth Games medallists in swimming
Medallists at the 2006 Commonwealth Games
Medallists at the 2010 Commonwealth Games